Oskar Theodor (3 October 1898 – 1987) was an Israeli entomologist who specialised in Diptera.

Born in Königsberg, East Prussia (now Kaliningrad, Russia) he came to pre-Israel Palestine following a year's service as an orderly in the Imperial German Army in World War I. In 1921 he became an assistant in the Government of Palestine Department of Health, and in 1923 he transferred to the Malaria Research Unit in Haifa. In 1925 he became an assistant in the Department of Parasitology in the University of Jerusalem, where he remained for the rest of his career.

In 1928, Oskar Theodor returned briefly to Königsberg to complete his Ph.D. in entomology at the University of Königsberg.

References

1898 births
1987 deaths
Dipterists
German emigrants to Mandatory Palestine
German Army personnel of World War I
Israeli entomologists
20th-century Israeli zoologists
Scientists from Königsberg
University of Königsberg alumni
Academic staff of the Hebrew University of Jerusalem